Kao Ching-yi is a Taiwanese taekwondo practitioner. 

She won a gold medal in heavyweight at the 1999 World Taekwondo Championships in Edmonton, after defeating Laurence Rase in the semifinal, and Dominique Bosshart in the final. She won a silver medal at the 1998 Asian Taekwondo Championships, and a bronze medal at the 1998 Asian Games.

References

External links

Year of birth missing (living people)
Living people
Taiwanese female taekwondo practitioners
Taekwondo practitioners at the 1998 Asian Games
Asian Games medalists in taekwondo
Medalists at the 1998 Asian Games
Asian Games bronze medalists for Chinese Taipei
World Taekwondo Championships medalists
Asian Taekwondo Championships medalists
20th-century Taiwanese women